Neoseiulus californicus is a predatory mite that feeds on Tetranychid mites. This species was first described on lemons from California under the name Typhlodromus californicus in 1954.

Description
The mite 0.04 mm long is pinkish red to pale white color with six legs. Males are smaller than females. The larvae are translucent. Females lay 2-4 eggs a day. Eggs take 1.5–4 days to hatch depending on temperatures. The adult female mites have the strongest ability to endure starvation, with an average survival time of about 8.16 days on just water while maintaining the ability to lay eggs, although in fewer quantities.

Distribution
This species has been found in  California, Texas, Florida, Chile, Argentina, Japan, South Africa, parts of southern Europe, and all along the border of the Mediterranean Sea inhabiting fruiting and vegetable crops.

Pest control
Neoseiulus californicus is used to control the twospotted spider mite (Tetranychus urticae), cyclamen mite (Phytonemus pallidus), Oligonychus perseae, Thrips and other small insects.

References

Phytoseiidae
Animals described in 1954